Raouf Salim Al Bernaoui (born 11 November 1975) is an Algerian sabre fencer. He competed at the 1996 and 2004 Summer Olympics.

References

External links
 

1975 births
Living people
Algerian male sabre fencers
Olympic fencers of Algeria
Fencers at the 1996 Summer Olympics
Fencers at the 2004 Summer Olympics
People from Algiers
21st-century Algerian people